Everything for the Company (German: Alles für die Firma) is a 1950 West German comedy film directed by Ferdinand Dörfler and starring Erhard Siedel, Lucie Englisch and Viktor Staal.  It was shot at the Bavaria Studios in Munich and on location in the city. The film's sets were designed by the art director Max Mellin.

Synopsis
A shop owner tries to plot a merger with a rival company.

Cast
 Erhard Siedel as 	Maximilian Schall
 Lucie Englisch as 	Evelyn Schall, Ehefrau
 Ilona Lamée as 	Monika Schall, Tochter
 Wilfried Seyferth as Peter Immermann
 Viktor Staal as 	Herr Knesing
 Mady Rahl as 	Lola
 Beppo Brem	
 Erika von Thellmann

References

Bibliography
 Bock, Hans-Michael & Bergfelder, Tim. The Concise CineGraph. Encyclopedia of German Cinema. Berghahn Books, 2009.

External links 
 

1950 films
1950 comedy films
German comedy films
West German films
1950s German-language films
Films directed by Ferdinand Dörfler
1950s German films
Films shot at Bavaria Studios
Films shot in Munich

de:Alles für die Firma (1950)